Mirador is a municipality in the state of Maranhão in the Northeast region of Brazil.

It contains the  Mirador State Park, created in 1980.

See also
List of municipalities in Maranhão

References

Municipalities in Maranhão